John Sloan (1871–1951) was an American painter and etcher.

John Sloan may also refer to:

John Sloan (businessman) (c. 1904–1988), American businessman
John Sloan Jr. (c. 1936–1991), American banking executive
John R. Sloan (1912–2001), British film producer
John Peter Sloan (1969–2020), English-born Italian actor, comedian and writer
John Sloan (medium) (fl. 1920s), Scottish spiritualist
Kee Sloan (John McKee Sloan, born 1955), American bishop
John Sloan, early settler at Sloan Lake, U.S.

See also 
John Sloane (disambiguation)
Jonathan Sloane (1785–1854), U.S. Representative from Ohio